James Storrie (7 February 1885 — 23 July 1951) was a Scottish first-class cricketer.

Storrie was born at Hawick in February 1885. A club cricketer for Hawick and Wilton, he was appointed captain in 1915 and continued to captain the team into the late 1930s, at which point he was over-50 years of age. Storrie had represented Scotland in two first-class cricket matches in 1911, against Ireland at Glasgow and the touring Indians at Galashiels. He scored 53 runs in his two matches, with a highest score of 26, and took a single wicket. Considered one of the most outstanding personalities in the history of cricket in Hawick, Storrie passed away in his home town on 23 July 1951 following a long illness. His brother, Walter, was also a first-class cricketer.

References

External links
 

1885 births
1951 deaths
Sportspeople from Hawick
Scottish cricketers